František Brož (14 July 1929 – 1 January 2018) was a Czech sprinter. He competed in the men's 100 metres at the 1952 Summer Olympics. He died in Prague on 1 January 2018, at the age of 88.

References

External links
 

1929 births
2018 deaths
Athletes (track and field) at the 1952 Summer Olympics
Czech male sprinters
Olympic athletes of Czechoslovakia
Sportspeople from Plzeň